Clare Smith (born 1933) is a Canadian retired ice hockey forward who was an All-American for Colorado College.

Career
Smith was part of CC's impressive recruiting class in 1952 and when he debuted for the team in 1953 he provided an immediate boost to the offense, leading the team in scoring at nearly two points per game. The following year he raised his total to 60 points, again leading the team in scoring, and helped CC return to the NCAA tournament. The Tigers made their third appearance in the championship game that season but couldn't manage to defeat Michigan despite a goal from Smith. For his great season, Smith was honored as an AHCA First Team All-American. and was named to the All-Tournament Second Team. Smith's offense declined significantly in his senior season and CC suffered accordingly; the Tigers slipped to third in the conference and narrowly missed out on another appearance in the national tournament.

Statistics

Regular season and playoffs

Awards and honors

References

External links

1933 births
Living people
Canadian ice hockey forwards
Brandon Wheat Kings players
Colorado College Tigers men's ice hockey players
Wembley Lions players
Ice hockey people from Alberta
Sportspeople from Red Deer, Alberta
AHCA Division I men's ice hockey All-Americans